Navin Chowdhry (born 1 January 1971) is a British actor. He is best known for his roles as Indra Ganesh in Doctor Who, Sunil Mitesh in The Job Lot and as Nish Panesar in the BBC soap opera EastEnders.

Early life
Chowdhry is of Indian-origin and was born and brought up in Bristol, England. Son of Simi Chowdhry, a well known public figure, a woman activist. In 1994 he graduated from Imperial College, London, earning a 3-year degree in biochemistry with 2:1 honours.

Career
At age 16, Chowdhry made his acting debut in the 1988 film, Madame Sousatzka with Shabana Azmi and Shirley MacLaine.

His next major role was as I.T. teacher Kurt McKenna in the successful comedy show Teachers in 2001–2003, and is also well known for playing PC Sanjay Singh in Dalziel and Pascoe. He also appeared as a possible rapist in Judge John Deed.

Chowdhry appeared in Waking The Dead, Series 3, Episode 3, entitled "Breaking Glass", opposite Trevor Eve and Sue Johnston. In the episode, he portrays the psychologically affected "Rainman". He then starred in the Channel 4 drama series NY-LON as Raph.

On 30 October 2005, he appeared on stage at the Old Vic theatre in London in the one-night play Night Sky alongside Christopher Eccleston, Bruno Langley, David Warner, Saffron Burrows and David Baddiel. In 2005 he made a guest appearance in Doctor Who, then starring Christopher Eccleston as the Doctor. In 2006, he appeared in the BBC Three drama series Sinchronicity, playing Mani.

In 2009, he appeared in two episodes of the Channel 4 series Free Agents and featured in Skellig. In 2010, he starred in the BBC television pilot Reunited, playing Danny.

Chowdhry has also produced projects such as the award-winning short film "This Bastard Business" and a short play entitled Mashed.

He played Anwar in the critically acclaimed 2015 BBC TV series Doctor Foster and in 2016 he played Sonny Desai in Series 18's first episode of Midsomer Murders.

Chowdhry portrayed Nodin Chavdri in the 2017 film Star Wars: The Last Jedi.

In 2019, he appeared in Sarah Rutherford's play "The Girl Who Fell" at Trafalgar Studios.

In 2022, Chowdhry began playing the previously unseen and imprisoned Nish Panesar in EastEnders. Nish, a manipulative psychopath, first appeared during the final stages of his 20-year prison sentence and was released shortly thereafter.

Filmography

Film

Television

References

External links
 

2006 Interview

1971 births
Living people
Male actors from Bristol
Alumni of Imperial College London
English male film actors
English male television actors
English male actors of South Asian descent
English people of Indian descent
British male actors of Indian descent